The olivaceous flatbill (Rhynchocyclus olivaceus) is a species of bird in the family Tyrannidae.

It is found in Bolivia, Brazil, Colombia, Ecuador, French Guiana, Guyana, Panama, Peru, Suriname, and Venezuela. Its natural habitats are subtropical or tropical moist lowland forest and subtropical or tropical swamps.

References

olivaceous flatbill
Birds of the Amazon Basin
Birds of the Atlantic Forest
Birds of Colombia
Birds of the Guianas
Birds of Panama
Birds of Venezuela
olivaceous flatbill
Taxonomy articles created by Polbot